City of London Academy Highbury Grove (formerly Highbury Grove School) is an 11–18 mixed secondary school with academy status in the London Borough of Islington, England. It is part of the City of London Academies Trust.

History 
Highbury Grove School began life as an all-boys comprehensive in 1967. The founding headmaster was Dr Rhodes Boyson. It was created out of three former boys' schools in the area, Highbury Grammar School, Barnsbury Boys' School, and Laycock School, as part of a comprehensivisation scheme by the then Inner London Education Authority. Boyson introduced a regime of strict discipline, including caning for misbehaviour. Excellent academic results were achieved, and the school was soon heavily oversubscribed.

Boyson left in 1974 after being elected a Conservative MP; in the 1980s he was to become an education minister under Prime Minister Margaret Thatcher.

The school moved into a new building on the same site in December 2009.

In its December 2016 Ofsted report the school was described as "inadequate" by Ofsted, with particular concerns about discipline, pupil progress, and finances. In January 2017, the head teacher Tom Sherrington abruptly left the school, which was put into special measures. This led to the school being taken over in September by the City of London Academy Trust. In September, Ofsted inspectors revisited the school and found a “well-ordered environment in which pupils behave well”.

Students 
The school has approximately 1,200 pupils. A sizeable proportion of pupils have English as their second language. Over half the pupils are from Black Caribbean, Black African and Bangladeshi groups and about one third of pupils are from Turkish and other minority ethnic groups. Well over half of the pupils have been assessed with learning difficulties, disabilities, or literacy, dyslexia or language needs. As well, there is a school joined to the same building called 'Samuel Rhodes' (a school helping people who have needs and disabilities).

Notable alumni 
Adebayo Akinfenwa (The Beast) - Professional footballer for Wycombe Wanderers
Charlie Allen - local but Savile Row style tailor and designer. Sometime England kit designer.
Martin Burdfield - Gold medalist in Joinery at Worldskills, Educational consultant, chief examiner and author
Jason Chue (Wookie) - Musician/Producer/DJ
Micky Droy - Professional footballer for Chelsea F.C.
Peter Ebdon - Professional snooker player and former world champion
Hogan Ephraim - Professional footballer for Queens Park Rangers F.C. currently on loan at Whitehawk
Leroy Logan - British author known for significant contributions to policing in the United Kingdom. Founding member and later chair for 30 years of the National Black Police Association
Sid Owen (Ricky Butcher) EastEnders - Actor
Joe Swash - Actor and Television presenter
Frank Warren - Boxing Promoter
Jake Wood (Max Branning) EastEnders - Actor
Chris Whyte Footballer

References

External links 
 

Secondary schools in the London Borough of Islington
Academies in the London Borough of Islington
Educational institutions established in 1967
1967 establishments in England